Richard Campion may refer to:

 Richard Campion (swimmer) (born 1941), English-born swimmer and swimming administrator in Australia
 Richard Campion (theatre director) (1923–2013), New Zealand theatre director